Lovana S. 'Lou' Jones (March 28, 1938 – May 8, 2006) served as an Illinois State Representative from 1987 until her death in 2006. She was known for speaking up for abused and neglected children. Born in Mansfield, Ohio, Jones went to Ohio State University. Jones was an employee of the City of Chicago Department of Human Services. Jones defeated incumbent Larry Bullock in the 1986 Democratic primary for the Illinois House of Representatives. In April 3, 2011, a new Metra train station named after her, 35th Street/Lovana S. 'Lou' Jones/Bronzeville station, was opened on the Rock Island District line.

References

1938 births
2006 deaths
Politicians from Chicago
Politicians from Mansfield, Ohio
Ohio State University alumni
Members of the Illinois House of Representatives
Women state legislators in Illinois
20th-century American politicians
20th-century American women politicians
21st-century American politicians
21st-century American women politicians